The Catholic Church in Papua New Guinea and the Solomon Islands comprises only a Latin hierarchy, neither country has a national episcopal conference, but they jointly form the Episcopal Conference of Papua New Guinea and the Solomon Islands, comprising five ecclesiastical provinces, each headed by a Metropolitan Archbishop, and a total of seventeen suffragan bishoprics. There are no pre-diocesan, Eastern Catholic or other exempt jurisdictions. All defunct (often pre-diocesan missionary) jurisdictions are direct precursors of current sees. There is also an Apostolic Nunciature as papal diplomatic representation (embassy-level) to Papua New Guinea (at the national capital Port Moresby), in which the Apostolic Nunciature to the Solomon Islands is also vested. Episcopal Conference of Papua New Guinea and the Solomon Islands was adopted a new logo in 2019.

Current Latin sees in Papua New Guinea

Ecclesiastical Province of Madang 
 Metropolitan Archdiocese of Madang
Diocese of Aitape
Diocese of Lae
Diocese of Vanimo
Diocese of Wewak

Ecclesiastical Province of Mount Hagen 
 Metropolitan Archdiocese of Mount Hagen
Diocese of Goroka
Diocese of Kundiawa
Diocese of Mendi
Diocese of Wabag

Ecclesiastical Province of Port Moresby 
 Metropolitan Archdiocese of Port Moresby
Diocese of Alotau-Sideia
Diocese of Bereina
Diocese of Daru-Kiunga
Diocese of Kerema

Ecclesiastical Province of Rabaul 
 Metropolitan Archdiocese of Rabaul
Diocese of Bougainville
Diocese of Kavieng
Diocese of Kimbe

Current Latin sees in the Solomon Islands

Ecclesiastical Province of Honiara 
 Metropolitan Archdiocese of Honiara
 Roman Catholic Diocese of Auki
 Roman Catholic Diocese of Gizo

See also 
 List of Catholic dioceses (structured view)

Sources and external links 
 GCatholic.org - data for all sections.
 Catholic-Hierarchy entry.

Papua New Guinea

Catholic dioceses
Catholic dioceses